Thomas Joseph Condon (born October 26, 1952) is an American football agent and former right guard. He was named the most powerful agent in American football by Sporting News in 2006 and heads the Football Division of Creative Artists Agency (CAA) with fellow agent Ben Dogra. His clients include quarterbacks Sam Bradford, Drew Brees, Matthew Stafford, Matt Ryan, Alex Smith and brothers Peyton Manning and Eli Manning.

College career 
Condon went to Boston College in 1974 and was inducted into the Boston College Varsity Club Athletic Hall of Fame in 1984.

NFL career 
He was an offensive lineman for the Kansas City Chiefs between 1974 and 1984, and for the New England Patriots in 1985. After earning his Juris Doctor from the University of Baltimore during off-seasons and representing teammates while still playing in the NFL, he went on to become president of the National Football League Players Association (NFLPA) from 1984 to 1986.

Sports agency career 
In 1989, he earned his NFLPA Certification. He joined IMG in 1991. In his agency career, he has represented A.J. Green, J.J. Watt, Calais Campbell, Luke Kuechly, Richard Sherman, Joe Burrow, and many other NFL players.

References

1952 births
Living people
People from Derby, Connecticut
American football offensive guards
Boston College Eagles football players
Kansas City Chiefs players
New England Patriots players
University of Baltimore alumni
American sports agents
Presidents of the National Football League Players Association
Players of American football from Connecticut
Trade unionists from Connecticut
University of Baltimore School of Law alumni